Jamie Anderson is an American cinematographer.

Filmography
Film

Television

References

External links

Living people
American cinematographers
Year of birth missing (living people)